Sigma Delta Alpha is a Greek-lettered Latino-based fraternity established in spring 1992 at San José State University.

History 
The first interest group was formed in the Fall semester of 1991, at San Jose State University. Future Founding Father, Francisco Huerta, had the idea of creating a new organization on campus to serve the needs Latinos. Francisco Huerta took the forefront in organizing the initial meetings that set the groundwork for the establishment of Sigma Delta Alpha.

The first introductory meeting held in November 1991. The fraternity's ideological Purposes were set and after several meetings and numerous successful events it was decided that it was time for these individuals to present themselves to the community as an established organization. On May 5, 1992, Sigma Delta Alpha was officially recognized with 18 Founding Fathers.

This was one of only two Latino fraternities founded in the United States during the so-called fragmentation period from 1990 to 2000, and the third to ever be founded in California.

It is also one of the few Latino fraternities that eschew stepping, an important distinction when considering the cultural history of the practice.

Chapters

Chapter awards 
Cultural Ambassadors Certificate of Appreciation from City of Los Angeles, Alpha Chapter May 2006

USC MGC Fraternity of the Year Award, Alpha chapter 2009-2010 & 2011-2012

UNLV Greek Week 1st Place Overall Award, Gamma chapter 2009 & 2012

CSUS USFC Greek Week 1st Place Overall Award, Delta chapter 2009, 2010 & 2011

ΧΔ "Grand Slam" Philanthropy 1st Place Participation Award, CSUS Delta chapter 2011

ΔΓ "Anchor Splash" Philanthropy 1st Place Participation Award, UCR Eta chapter 2011

UNLV Rebel Awards Outstanding New Program
(Go Nutz for ΣΔΑ), Gamma chapter 2011

CSUF Greek Week 1st Place Overall Award, CSUF Zeta Chapter 2018

CSUF MGC-Overall Best GPA Award, CSUF Zeta Chapter 2020

CSUF Greek of the Year Award, Kenny Garcia, Alpha Beta Class, Zeta chapter 2022

Notable alumni 
 Mark Cardenas, Representative for Arizona House of Representatives, District 19
Oscar de los Santos, Rhodes Scholar

See also
List of social fraternities and sororities

References

External links
 Sigma Delta Alpha - National Website

Latino fraternities and sororities
Student organizations established in 1992
San Jose State University
1991 establishments in California